Yosbel Martínez (born 18 August 1976) is a Cuban rower. He competed at the 2000 Summer Olympics and the 2004 Summer Olympics.

References

1976 births
Living people
Cuban male rowers
Olympic rowers of Cuba
Rowers at the 2000 Summer Olympics
Rowers at the 2004 Summer Olympics
People from Pinar del Río
Pan American Games medalists in rowing
Pan American Games gold medalists for Cuba
Pan American Games bronze medalists for Cuba
Rowers at the 2003 Pan American Games
Medalists at the 2003 Pan American Games